Maryann Garza Perez (born May 15, 1962) is a Democratic member of the Texas House of Representatives for House District 144 in Harris County, Texas. Perez previously served one term from 2013 to 2015. An insurance agent, she is a former member of the trustees of Houston Community College.

Business career
Perez owns an insurance agency located in Southeast Harris County, Texas.

Electoral history
Perez won the District 144 House seat in 2012 over Republican David Pineda. She received 12,446 votes (52.1 percent) to his 10,885 (45.5 percent). The remaining 2.4 percent was held by the Libertarian Party nominee, Robb Rourke.

Perez was narrowly unseated after one term in the November 4, 2014 general election by Republican Gilbert Peña of Houston. He polled 6,015 votes (50.6 percent) to her 5,863 (49.4 percent).

Perez faced Peña again in the 2016 general election, when she outpolled her opponent, 16,258 votes (60.2 percent) to 10,736 (39.8 percent). Perez was sworn in for her second term January 10, 2017. In the 85th Legislative Session, Perez serves on the Appropriations Committee and the Special Purpose Districts Committee, of which she is Vice Chair.

Perez won reelection in the general election held on November 6, 2018. With 14,324 votes (61.2 percent), she defeated her Republican challenger, Ruben Villarreal, who polled 9,088 (38.8 percent).

Personal life
Perez has two sons.

References

|-

External links
 
Legislative page
Texas Tribune Profile

1962 births
Living people
Women state legislators in Texas
Hispanic and Latino American state legislators in Texas
Hispanic and Latino American women in politics
Democratic Party members of the Texas House of Representatives
University of Houston–Downtown alumni
School board members in Texas
21st-century American politicians
21st-century American women politicians